Thomas or Tom Mitchell may refer to:

Politics
 Thomas Alexander Mitchell (1812–1875), British Member of Parliament for Bridport
 Thomas B. Mitchell (died 1876), New York politician
 Thomas R. Mitchell (1783–1837), U.S. Representative from South Carolina
 Tom Mitchell (Australian politician) (1906–1984), Australian politician, author and skier
 Tom Mitchell (Irish politician) (1931–2020), Irish republican

Sports
 Thomas Mitchell (football manager) (1843–1921), manager of Blackburn Rovers and Woolwich Arsenal football clubs
 Thomas Mitchell (Kent cricketer) (1907–1960), English cricketer
 Tom Mitchell (American football) (1944–2017), American football player
 Tom Mitchell (Australian footballer) (born 1993), Australian rules football player
 Tom Mitchell (English footballer) (1899–1984), English footballer and manager
 Tom Mitchell (rugby union, born 1958), Fijian rugby union player
 Tom Mitchell (rugby union, born 1989), English rugby union player, captain of England national rugby sevens team
 Tommy Mitchell (1902–1996), Derbyshire cricketer
 Tommy Mitchell (footballer), (1905–1970), English footballer

Other fields
 Thomas Mitchell (actor) (1892–1962), American actor
 Thomas Mitchell (explorer) (1792–1855), Scottish explorer of Australia
 Thomas Mitchell (Medal of Honor) (1857–1942), United States Navy sailor and Medal of Honor recipient
 Thomas Mitchell (painter) (died 1790), English marine painter and naval official
 Thomas Noel Mitchell (born 1939), Irish academic
 Thomas W. Mitchell, American law professor
 Thomas Walker Mitchell (1869–1944), British physician and psychical researcher
 Tom M. Mitchell (born 1951), American computer scientist

See also
 Thomas Michell (died 1551), English MP